Luke Browning (born 31 January 2002) is a British racing driver who is currently competing in the 2023 FIA Formula 3 Championship, driving for Hitech Grand Prix. He previously won the 2022 GB3 Championship and the 2020 F4 British Championship with Hitech and Fortec Motorsports respectively.

Career

Junior Saloon Car Championship 
In 2016 Browning made his debut in car racing, competing in the Junior Saloon Car Championship in the UK. He won a race and was awarded the title "Henry Surtees Teen Racer of the Year 2016", having finished ninth in his first year in motorsport competition.

Ginetta Junior Championship 
For 2017, the Brit made a switch to the Ginetta Junior Championship with Richardson Racing. Browning's season highlight would end up being a pole position he scored in the second Silverstone race, and he placed eleventh in the standings. In the following season Browning stayed on with Richardson Racing. His season started out strongly, with three victories after four races. However, over the course of the season Browning ultimately lost out to the Elite Motorsport duo of Louis Foster and eventual champion Adam Smalley. Browning scored enough points to win the championship taking Oulton park into account, only to lose his race 1 win due to a mechanical infringement. He went on to win race 2 in dramatic style by 11 seconds. Ultimately Browning finished in third position after a neck and neck season with a total of eight victories and ten further podium finishes.

Formula 4 

Browning progressed to the F4 British Championship in 2019, once again remaining with Richardson Racing. Browning won his first ever single-seater race at the opening race of the season, a very wet Brands Hatch. Having started the race from a lowly tenth place after engine issues in qualifying he made a similar drive through the field in the mixed condition race 2, only to collide with Zane Maloney on the last corner on the final lap. Browning took the chequered flag first, but was later docked to third after a 10 second time penalty. The Brit added to that tally with a victory at the Thruxton Circuit. His season ended with four podiums from the final four races, and Browning ended up sixth in the championship. In 2020, Browning moved to Fortec Motorsport for his title push season of British F4, partnering Rafael Villagómez and Roberto Faria for parts of the season. The season was memorable for the tight battle for the title between Browning and Carlin's Zak O'Sullivan. The pair exchanged victories at almost every weekend, with the round at Thruxton being the only exception. Browning ended up winning the championship over his rival after a titanic battle. Coming into the title deciding round even on points, Browning ultimately edged the pair after securing a wet double pole position.

GB3 Championship 
On 9 September 2021 Browning announced that he would be making his debut in the GB3 Championship at Oulton Park. Driving for his title-winning outfit from the previous year, Browning experienced an eventful one off weekend in the 2021 season. Having finished his first race in the category in second place, only behind the dominant Zak O'Sullivan, Browning overtook the latter around the outside of turn one and went on to win the second race. He was caught up in an unavoidable incident in the full reverse grid race 3 and retired shortly after.

Formula Regional 
During the 2023 pre-season, Browning joined Hitech Grand Prix for the second and third rounds of the 2023 Formula Regional Middle East Championship.

FIA Formula 3 Championship 
Browning partook in the 2023 Formula 3 pre-season testing with Hitech Pulse-Eight. On 1st March 2023, just two days before the season started, Hitech announced the signing of Browning, ultimately completing its F3 roster for the upcoming season.

Racing record

Career summary 

* Season still in progress.

Complete F4 British Championship results
(key) (Races in bold indicate pole position) (Races in italics indicate fastest lap)

Complete ADAC Formula 4 Championship results 
(key) (Races in bold indicate pole position) (Races in italics indicate fastest lap)

Complete GB3 Championship results 
(key) (Races in bold indicate pole position) (Races in italics indicate fastest lap)

Complete Formula Regional Middle East Championship results
(key) (Races in bold indicate pole position) (Races in italics indicate fastest lap)

Complete FIA Formula 3 Championship results 
(key) (Races in bold indicate pole position) (Races in italics indicate fastest lap)

* Season still in progress.

References

External links 

 

2002 births
Living people
British racing drivers
BRDC British Formula 3 Championship drivers
Ginetta Junior Championship drivers
Hitech Grand Prix drivers
ADAC Formula 4 drivers
Italian F4 Championship drivers
US Racing drivers
Fortec Motorsport drivers
UAE F4 Championship drivers
Formula Regional Middle East Championship drivers
FIA Formula 3 Championship drivers